Leonid Labzov (born October 23, 1973) is a Russian and Soviet former professional ice hockey defenceman. He is a one-time Russian Champion.

Awards and honors

References

External links
Biographical information and career statistics from Eliteprospects.com, or The Internet Hockey Database

1973 births
Living people
Ak Bars Kazan players
HC Neftekhimik Nizhnekamsk players
Neftyanik Almetyevsk players
Russian ice hockey defencemen
Sportspeople from Kazan